Zero Range Combat (Zerorenjikonbatto, also referred to as 零距離戦闘術, Rei kyori sentō-jutsu, which translates to Zero Range Combat) is a Japanese martial art inspired by military combatives.

The founder is Yoshitaka Inagawa, who is publicly referred to as "sentō-sha" (戦闘者, eng. battler or combatant), and "master instructor" (マスターインストラクター masutāinsutorakutā) to his martial arts peers. The name "sentō-sha" is different from "martial arts" and/or "fighter" in that it means a person who is particular about military "battle", referring closer to something akin to "military artsman" (兵法者,  Heihōsha).

History
ZRC gained prominence in Japan when it was used in High&Low The Red Rain and Re:Born.

Curriculum
While ZRC trains anyone learning the martial art via bare hands, knives, swords, batons, flashlights and handguns, the use of rifles is also included in its curriculum.

Techniques
ZRC was inspired by Inagawa learning Muay Thai Boran, Sambo, Systema and Eskrima.

Use
Inagawa has provided self-defence guidance to the members of the JGSDF Central Readiness Regiment.

See also
 Jieitaikakutōjutsu

References

External links
 

Hybrid martial arts
Japanese martial arts